Player of the month may refer to:

In English football:
Premier League Player of the Month
EFL Championship Player of the Month
EFL League One Player of the Month
EFL League Two Player of the Month
Football League First Division Player of the Month
Football League Second Division Player of the Month
Football League Third Division Player of the Month

In French football:
UNFP Player of the Month

In Spanish football:
La Liga Player of the Month

In Italian football:
Serie A Player of the Month

In other sports:
ACB Player of the Month Award
Major League Baseball Player of the Month Award